Sandakan Harbour Square is an urban renewal project that was built under a reclaimed land in the Sandakan city. It was a project comprising a new central market, shop office, boutique hotel, waterfront esplanade and a five-storey shopping mall connecting into an international class hotel.

Geography 
Being built strategically overlooking the Sulu Sea, the project is considered as the new central business district of the city.
The mall before this has a convention centre on the 11th floor. After a few years, it was turned into a cinemas. The hotel that was connected to the mall before this was being managed by Starwood under the brand Four Points by Sheraton. However the hotel has been closed in the end of May 2020 due to a small demand to the hotel serviced.

Construction 
The Harbour Square is a joint venture between Ireka and Sandakan Municipal Council.  It was developed by ICSD Ventures Sdn Bhd, a subsidiary of Ireka Corp Bhd's London-listed associate Aseana Properties Ltd. and managed by Ireka Development Management Sdn Bhd. 
The project started in 2003, less than two years after it was first proposed.

The project consists of four phases that were completed at different times. The central market, which was part of phase 1, was completed in 2006 after a groundbreaking in 2004 by the Sabah Chief Minister, Tan Sri Musa Aman.

After several months of construction of the new central market being completed, the old central market was later demolished to upgrade the area into a new shop office.  

Phase two comprising three- and four- storey shop offices was completed in 2009. Not only that, Sandakan Harbour Square also received an award at the Asia Pacific Property Awards in the commercial redevelopment category in 2009.

The master development, Harbour Mall and the hotel construction began in 2008. It was completed and opened to the public in 2012. The mall is considered to be Sandakan's first modern shopping mall.

Attractions 
One of the nearest tourist attraction is the "Utan" sculpture that was located in front of the mall.

Sandakan Heritage Trail is a walk that cover the town important and interesting sites that have contributed to the city historical past. 

The one hour walks bring you back to over 100 years ago to the bygone era of British North Borneo.

References

External links 
Harbour Mall Sandakan official website
Sandakan Harbour Square photos galleries
Sandakan Division
Sabah

Urban renewal
Sandakan